The 1970 British League season was the 36th season of the top tier of speedway in the United Kingdom and the sixth season known as the British League.

Summary
Wembley Lions under the promotion of Trevor Redmond and Bernard Cottrel entered the British league having bought the licence - and inherited the riders - from the Coatbridge Monarchs. It was the first time since 1956 that Wembley would compete in the league.

Belle Vue Aces secured their first British League title. The Manchester team were once again led by the brilliant Ivan Mauger who would secure a third consecutive world champion title before the end of the season. He topped the averages with 11.18 as the team finished ten points ahead of their nearest rivals Wimbledon Dons. The Dons found some consolation when winning their third consecutive British League Knockout Cup.

Final table
M = Matches; W = Wins; D = Draws; L = Losses; Pts = Total Points

British League Knockout Cup
The 1970 Speedway Star British League Knockout Cup was the 32nd edition of the Knockout Cup for tier one teams. Wimbledon Dons were the winners for the third consecutive year. It was the first time that the competition was sponsored by the Speedway Star.

First round

Second round

Quarter-finals

Semi-finals

Final

First leg

Second leg

Wimbledon Dons were declared Knockout Cup Champions, winning on aggregate 80-75.

Final leading averages

Riders & final averages
Belle Vue

 11.18
 9.66
 7.91
 7.31
 5.79
 5.33
 5.33
 4.25
 3.52

Coventry

 10.66
 8.50 
 7.78 
 6.08
 5.91
 5.90
 5.66 
 1.58

Cradley Heath

 9.29
 8.45
 7.75
 7.51 
 4.38
 4.09
 3.50
 2.65

Exeter

 10.09 
 9.47
 6.81
 6.09
 5.30
 5.21
 4.81
 4.62

Glasgow

 10.27
 8.53 
 7.79
 5.36 
 5.33
 5.33
 3.64
 1.85
 1.64

Hackney

 9.49
 8.20
 6.08
 6.01
 5.96
 4.83
 4.71
 3.59

Halifax

 10.54 
 8.21 
 7.80
 7.04 
 5.95
 5.80
 4.27

King's Lynn

 9.22
 (Kid Bodie) 8.49 
 7.58
 5.05
 4.97
 4.44
 4.36
 4.32
 3.31

Leicester

 10.80 
 9.34 
 6.72
 5.71 
 5.04
 4.76
 4.51
 3.43

Newcastle

 10.88 
 7.88 
 6.62 
 5.15
 4.30
 4.06
 3.91

Newport

 8.45
 7.78 
 6.38
 4.57
 4.34
 4.09
 3.91
 3.77
 2.24

Oxford

 9.10
 7.03 
 6.66
 6.48
 6.38
 5.89
 4.76
 2.82

Poole

 7.93
 7.72
 7.39
 7.29
 5.84
 4.76
 4.70
 2.36

Sheffield

 10.86
 8.88
 7.03
 5.32
 5.20
 4.27
 3.23
 2.54

Swindon

 10.53
 9.68 
 5.58
 5.26
 4.57
 4.34
 3.45

Wembley

 9.10
 7.93
 7.31 
 5.85
 4.76
 4.17
 3.82
 3.26
 2.43

West Ham

 9.36
 7.82
 7.45
 5.62
 5.38
 4.63
 4.61
 4.25
 4.15
 3.56

Wimbledon

 9.97
 9.95
 7.74
 6.67
 6.34
 5.93
 4.25
 3.78
 2.33

Wolverhampton

 10.25
 7.33
 6.62
 5.31
 5.29
 5.23
 5.12
 4.07

See also
List of United Kingdom Speedway League Champions
Knockout Cup (speedway)

References

British League
1970 in British motorsport
1970 in speedway